James Bedell McKean (August 5, 1821 Hoosick, Rensselaer County, New York – January 5, 1879 Salt Lake City, Utah) was an American politician from New York and Utah.

Early life
He was one of the professors in Jonesville Academy for some time. He was the Superintendent of the Common Schools of Halfmoon, New York in 1842.

McKean was elected colonel of the One Hundred and Forty-fourth Regiment, New York State Militia, in 1844. Then he studied law, was admitted to the bar in 1849, and commenced practice in Ballston Spa, New York. He moved to Saratoga Springs, New York in 1851. He was First Judge of the Saratoga County Court from 1855 to 1858.

McKean was elected as a Republican to the 36th and 37th United States Congresses, and served from March 4, 1859, to March 3, 1863. He was Chairman of the Committee on Expenditures in the Department of State.

During the American Civil War, he organized the 77th New York Volunteer Infantry, in 1861 and served as colonel of the regiment until July 27, 1863, when he resigned his commission due to poor health.

He was appointed treaty commissioner to Honduras in 1865. In 1867, he ran for Secretary of State of New York on the Republican ticket, but was defeated by Democrat Homer Augustus Nelson.

He was appointed Chief Justice of the Superior Court of the Utah Territory by President Ulysses S. Grant in 1870 and served until 1875. In Utah history, McKean is famous for intensifying the federal government's efforts to abolish polygamy, which some members of the Church of Jesus Christ of Latter-day Saints practiced as a religious doctrine until 1890. Evidence suggests McKean believed it was his moral and religious duty to wage legal war against the practice and that questionable tactics were justified if they helped him achieve his goal. Shortly after his appointment, McKean wrote to a friend, "[T]he mission which God has called me to perform in Utah, is as much above the duties of other courts and judges as the heavens are above the earth, and whenever or wherever I may find the Local or Federal laws obstructing or interfering therewith, by God's blessings I shall trample them under my feet."

During McKean's tenure in Utah, Mormon leader Brigham Young was indicted for "lascivious cohabitation," the federal government's strongest case against polygamy at that time. To ensure Young's and other Mormons' convictions, McKean essentially banned members of the LDS Church from serving on juries, a decision which the Supreme Court of the United States later ruled against. Consequently, all charges against Young at that time were quashed.

McKean was interred in Mount Olivet Cemetery in Salt Lake City.

Samuel McKean was his uncle.

References

 Retrieved on 2009-04-17
 Bio at On-line Biographies, transcribed from Our County and Its People - a descriptive and biographical record of Saratoga County, NY (The Boston History Co. Publ. 1899) [gives, like all contemporaneous sources, Hoosick as birthplace; "Bennington" appears only from 1978 on, probably a listing mistake which has been copied and perpetuated]
The New York Civil List compiled by Franklin Benjamin Hough (page 364; Weed, Parsons and Co., 1858) [gives wrong middle initial "D."]

1821 births
1879 deaths
People from Hoosick, New York
American people of Scotch-Irish descent
Republican Party members of the United States House of Representatives from New York (state)
19th-century American politicians
Utah Territorial judges
Chief Justices of the Utah Supreme Court
19th-century American judges
People of New York (state) in the American Civil War
Union Army colonels